Mesut Yavaş (born 14 April 1978) is a Turkish athlete.

He competed in the men's long jump at the 2000 Summer Olympics.

He achieved the Turkish indoor record in the long jump in March 2000, jumping 8.09 metres in Ames, Iowa. In the summer he jumped 8.08 metres in Istanbul, setting a Turkish outdoor record.
In the same year he finished second at the Balkan Championships, and took his sole Turkish championship.

Yavaş won the Balkan Championships in 2001. He was able to compete in the ISTAF meet and also competed at the 2001 World Championships without reaching the final. In 2003 he finished fourth at the Balkan Championships, and competed at the Summer Universiade without reaching the final. He subsequently ceased competing.

Competing in the US college system for Arkansas State University, he graduated with a bachelor's degree in engineering in late 2005.

References

1978 births
Living people
Athletes (track and field) at the 2000 Summer Olympics
Turkish male long jumpers
Olympic athletes of Turkey
Place of birth missing (living people)
Arkansas State University alumni
Arkansas State Red Wolves athletes
Turkish expatriates in the United States